Seo Myeong-Won (born 19 April 1995) is a South Korean footballer who plays as a forward for Jeonnam Dragons.

Career
He signed with Daejeon Citizen in 2014. He made his debut in the league match against Suwon FC and his debut goal next match against Goyang Hi FC.

References

External links 

Soccerway profile: https://int.soccerway.com/players/myeong-won-seo/333553/

1995 births
Living people
Association football forwards
South Korean footballers
Daejeon Hana Citizen FC players
Ulsan Hyundai FC players
Gangwon FC players
K League 2 players
K League 1 players
People from Dangjin